Jay Shi (born February 23, 1979) is an American sports shooter. He competed in the men's 10 metre air pistol event at the 2016 Summer Olympics.

References

External links
 

1979 births
Living people
American male sport shooters
Olympic shooters of the United States
Shooters at the 2016 Summer Olympics
Place of birth missing (living people)
Pan American Games medalists in shooting
Pan American Games silver medalists for the United States
Shooters at the 2015 Pan American Games
Medalists at the 2015 Pan American Games